Madhusudhanan (born 1956 in Allapuzha) is an Indian film maker and artist, known for his films, paintings and art installations. His film, Bioscope has received several awards.

Biography 
K. M. Madhusudhanan was born in 1956 in Alappuzha, a coastal district in Kerala. He studied Painting at Fine Arts College, Thiruvananthapuram, Kerala, and Print Making at the Faculty of Fine Arts, M.S. University, Vadodara, Gujarat. He lives in his home state of Kerala.

Exhibitions
 56th Venice Biennale, Italy: 'All the World's Futures', Curated by Okwui Enwezor: 9 May 2015 - 22 November 2015
 Kochi Muziris Biennale, Noida, India: 'Whorled Explorations', curated by Jitish Kallat: 12 December 2014 - 29 March 2015
 Kiran Nadar Museum of Art, Noida, India: Pond Near the Field: 25 November 2015 - 29 February 2016
 Delhi Art Fair, Vadehra Art Gallery: 28 January 2016 - 31 January 2016

Filmography
 Balamaniyamma, Documentary, English, Malayalam, 1997
 O.V. Vijayan, English, Malayalam, Documentary, 2000
 Self Portrait, Short Fiction, Hindi, 2001
 History is a Silent Film, Short Fiction, Silent, 2006
 Mayabazaar, Documentary, Telugu, English, 2006
 Razor, Blood and Other Tales, Short Fiction, Silent, 2007
 Bioscope, Feature Film, Malayalam, Tamil, 2008

Awards and recognition
Self Portrait, 2001
•	Best Film, Thessaloniki Festival, Greece
•	Outstanding Film from International Festivals, MoMA, New York

History is a Silent Film, 2006
•	Outstanding Film from International Festivals, MoMA, New York

Bioscope, 2008
Osian Cinefan International Film Festival, NETPAC Jury Award for Best Asian Film
Special Mention Jury Award, Mannheim-Heidelberg International Festival, Germany
Best Cinematography Award, SAIFF, New York
5 Kerala State Film Awards
o	Special Jury Award for Direction
o	Best Cinematography
o	Best Editing
o	Best Background Score
o	Best Film Processing Lab
Special Jury Award, National Film Awards

Books and articles
•	On Bioscope: Rhythm of Light, Malayalam, Dr. V. Sanil
•	The Gaze of Cinema, Malayalam, Dr. K. Gopinathan
•	K.M. Madhusudhanan’s Bioscope, English, Shekhar Deshpande
•	Scholars Watching Elephant, English, Leo Bankersen
•	Bioscope Script, Malayalam, Published by Mathrubhoomi Books
•• A Turning Point, Interview, Screen India

References

External links 
 Official website of K.M. Madhusudhanan
 Official website of K.M. Madhusudhanan's first feature film Bioscope

Living people
Artists from Alappuzha
Screenwriters from Kerala
Film directors from Kerala
1956 births